Dennis Hartley (11 April 1936 – 13 November 2019) was an English professional rugby league footballer who played as a  in the 1950s, 1960s and 1970s. 

He played at representative level for Great Britain, England and Yorkshire, and at club level for Doncaster (Heritage № 82), Hunslet and Castleford (Heritage №503).

Background
Dennis Hartley was born in Hemsworth, Wakefield, West Riding of Yorkshire, England.

Playing career

Doncaster
Hartley started his career at Doncaster, making 120 appearances for the club.

Hunslet
Hartley made 202 appearances for Hunslet between 1960 and 1966.

Hartley played left-, in Hunslet's 16–20 defeat by Wigan in the 1965 Challenge Cup Final during the 1964–65 season at Wembley Stadium, London on Saturday 8 May 1965, in front of a crowd of 89,016.

Hartley also played left-, and scored a try in Hunslet's 12–2 victory over Hull Kingston Rovers in the 1962 Yorkshire County Cup Final during the 1962–63 season at Headingley Rugby Stadium, Leeds on Saturday 27 October 1962, and played left- in the 8–17 defeat by Bradford Northern in the 1965 Yorkshire County Cup Final during the 1965–66 season at Headingley Rugby Stadium, Leeds on Saturday 16 October 1965.

Castleford
Hartley also played left- in Castleford’s 11–6 victory over Salford in the 1969 Challenge Cup Final during the 1968–69 season at Wembley Stadium, London on Saturday 17 May 1969, in front of a crowd of 97,939, and played left- in the 7–2 victory over Wigan in the 1970 Challenge Cup Final during the 1969–70 season at Wembley Stadium, London on Saturday 9 May 1970, in front of a crowd of 95,255.

Hartley played left- in Castleford's 11–22 defeat by Leeds in the 1968 Yorkshire County Cup Final during the 1968–69 season at Belle Vue, Wakefield on Saturday 19 October 1968, and played left- in the 7–11 defeat by Hull Kingston Rovers in the 1971 Yorkshire County Cup Final during the 1971–72 season at Belle Vue, Wakefield on Saturday 21 August 1971.

Hartley played left-, in Castleford's 7–2 victory over Swinton in the 1966 BBC2 Floodlit Trophy Final during the 1966–67 season at Wheldon Road, Castleford on Tuesday 20 December 1966, and played left- in the 8–5 victory over Leigh in the 1967 BBC2 Floodlit Trophy Final during the 1967–68 season at Headingley, Leeds on Saturday 16 January 1968.

Representative honours
Hartley won a cap for England while at Castleford in 1968 against Wales, and won caps for Great Britain while at Hunslet in 1964 against France (2 matches), while at Castleford in 1968 against France, in 1969 against France, in 1970 against Australia (2 matches), New Zealand (2 matches), and in the 1970 Rugby League World Cup against Australia, France and Australia.

Hartley also won caps playing left-, for Yorkshire while at Castleford in the 17–22 defeat by Lancashire at Leeds' stadium on 21 September 1966, the 10–5 victory over Lancashire at Hull Kingston Rovers' stadium on 25 September 1968, the 12–14 defeat by Lancashire at Salford's stadium on 3 September 1969, and the 15–21 defeat by Cumberland at Whitehaven's stadium on 14 September 1970.

Honours
Hartley is a Castleford Hall of Fame inductee.

References

1936 births
2019 deaths
Castleford Tigers players
Doncaster R.L.F.C. players
England national rugby league team players
English rugby league players
Great Britain national rugby league team players
Hunslet F.C. (1883) players
People from Hemsworth
Rugby league hookers
Rugby league players from Wakefield
Rugby league props
Yorkshire rugby league team players